Ebrahimabad (also Romanized as Ebrāhīmābād) is a village in Ramjin Rural District, Chaharbagh District, Savojbolagh County, Alborz Province, Iran. At the 2006 census, its population was 473, in 122 families.

References 

Populated places in Savojbolagh County